Aelred J. (Al) Kurtenbach (born January 3, 1934) is an American electrical engineer. He was also briefly member of the South Dakota State Senate in 2004.

Kurtenbach is the founder of Daktronics, Inc., based in Brookings, South Dakota. He attended the South Dakota School of Mines and Technology, the University of Nebraska and Purdue University. He was also a professor at South Dakota State University. He was awarded an honorary degree from Purdue University in 2011 and one from South Dakota State in 2007. He has been a member of the Brookings School Board, South Dakota Board of Regents, Education Committee for the South Dakota Chamber of Commerce & Industry, South Dakota Enterprise Institute, and the board of the National Association of Manufacturers

References

Living people
1934 births
People from Hutchinson County, South Dakota
American electrical engineers
Republican Party South Dakota state senators
South Dakota State University faculty
South Dakota School of Mines and Technology alumni
Purdue University alumni
University of Nebraska alumni
School board members in South Dakota
People from Brookings, South Dakota